PAST or Past may refer to:

 past, the totality of events which occurred before a given moment in time
 Past tense
 PAST (Poland) (Polish: , Polish Telephone Joint-stock Company), a defunct Polish telephone operator
 PAST Foundation, an American educational foundation
 PAST storage utility, a distributed storage system
 Pan African School of Theology (PAST), Nyahururu, Kenya
 Primeval Structure Telescope (PaST), a Chinese radio telescope
 Summit Airport (Alaska) (ICAO airport code: PAST)
 Past a sculpture in Washington, D.C, by Robert Ingersoll Aitken
 PAST: The Newsletter of the Prehistoric Society

See also
 The Past (disambiguation)
 Past and Present (disambiguation)
 Yesterday (disambiguation)
 Then (disambiguation)
 Present (disambiguation)
 Future (disambiguation)